Grana is an online fashion company based in Hong Kong. In addition to operating online, Grana has an offline showroom called “The Fitting Room” in Hong Kong, where people can try on the products and order online. Grana was co-founded by Luke Grana and Pieter-Paul Wittgen and officially launched in October 2014. Grana opened their first brick-and-mortar store in Hong Kong in September 2015.

Products

The company sources its products directly from fabric mills, which reduces markup pricing. Grana clothing products include silks, linen, cashmere, merino, tencel, pima cotton and baby alpaca wools. The fabrics are sourced internationally from a variety of countries including China, France, Mongolia, Austria, Peru and Italy. Grana’s ‘new luxury’ brand focuses its ethic on sustainable fashion setting itself apart from mass consumerism. Central to Grana’s business and production is ethical manufacturing.

History 
Grana’s CEO and founder, Luke Grana, set up the company as an online-only direct-to-consumer seller. 

Prior to becoming CEO and namesake of Grana, he was a serial entrepreneur from Australia. He had previously invested into the catering industry among other areas, and seeded his first fashion brand, Grana, with $200,000 in 2014. Grana raised the initial seed round of US $1 million from Bluebell group and angel investors in October 2014, and in July 2015, closed another seed funding round of US $1.5 million involving investors from Singaporean VC Golden Gate Ventures. In 2016, Grana announced their Series A funding round of US $10 million led by Alibaba Group under The Hong Kong Entrepreneurs Fund, with participation from existing investors. By 2017, Grana had been the recipient of nine separate investments from various companies totaling $16 million.

References

Further reading

External links
 
 

Clothing companies of Hong Kong
Online companies of China